The Tjeker or Tjekker (Egyptian: ṯꜣkꜣr or ṯꜣkkꜣr) were one of the Sea Peoples.

Known mainly from the "Story of Wenamun", the Tjeker are also documented earlier, at Medinet Habu, as raiders defeated by Pharaoh Ramesses III of Egypt in years 5, 8, and 12 of his reign. They are thought to be the people who developed the port of Dor in Canaan during the 12th century BCE from a small Bronze Age town to a large city.

Origin
As with other Sea Peoples, the origins of the Tjeker are uncertain. Their name is an Egyptian exonym, usually romanized as tkr, and expanded as Tjekru or Djekker. The Egyptian may also be romanized as skl, i.e. Sikil or Sical. As such there is no consensus on the original form or etymology of the name, or the origin of the people. They have sometimes been identified with the Sicels of Sicily, who are also linked to Shekelesh: another exonym  attributed to a different group amongst the Sea Peoples. Another theory, put forward by Flinders Petrie, links the ethnonym to Zakros, in eastern Crete. Some other scholars have accepted the association. A possible identity has been suggested with the Teucri, a tribe described by ancient sources as inhabiting northwest Anatolia to the south of Troy. However, this has been dismissed as "pure speculation" by Trevor Bryce.

Settlement at Dor

The Tjeker may have conquered the city Dor, on the coast of Canaan near modern Haifa, and turned it into a large, well-fortified city (classified as "Dor XII", fl. c. 1150–1050), the center of a Tjeker kingdom that is confirmed archaeologically in the northern Sharon plain. The city was violently destroyed in the mid-11th century BCE, with the conflagration turning the mud bricks red and depositing a huge layer of ash and debris. Ephraim Stern connects the destruction with the contemporary expansion of the Phoenicians, which was checked by the Philistines further south and the Israelites.

The Tjeker are perhaps one of the few Sea Peoples for whom a ruler's name is recorded — in the 11th-century papyrus account of Wenamun, an Egyptian priest, the ruler of Dor is given as "Beder".

According to Edward Lipinski, the Sicals (Tjekker) of Dor were seamen or mercenaries, and b3-dỉ-r (Beder) was the title of the local governor, a deputy of the king of Tyre.

No mention of the Tjeker is made after the story of Wenamun.

Notes

References

 Stern, Ephraim  (August 1990). "New Evidence from Dor for the First Appearance of the Phoenicians along the Northern Coast of Israel" Bulletin of the American Schools of Oriental Research No. 279, pp. 27–34.

 Woudhuizen, Frederik Christiaan (April 2006). The Ethnicity of the Sea Peoples. Doctoral dissertation; Rotterdam: Erasmus Universiteit Rotterdam, Faculteit der Wijsbegeerte.

Sea Peoples